Lapidation is an album by composer and keyboardist Anthony Coleman performed by a various lineups from large ensembles to solo pianists and released on the New World label in 2006.

Reception

In his review for Allmusic, Blair Sanderson states "Angular lines, piercing sonorities, and abrupt changes of mood characterize Coleman's sharply defined music, and its edginess makes this album best suited for adventurous listeners".

Track listing
All compositions by Anthony Coleman
 "Lapidation" – 10:33   
 "East Orange" – 2:33   
 "I Diet on Cod" – 12:36   
 "Mise en Abîme" – 13:22   
 "The King of Kabay" – 10:54

Personnel
Anthony Coleman – organ, conductor
Marty Ehrlich – tenor saxophone, clarinet
Ashley Paul, Chris Veilleux – alto saxophone
Doug Wieselman – clarinet, bass clarinet, E-flat clarinet
Ned Rothenberg – clarinet, bass clarinet
Dana Jessen – bassoon
Dan Barrett – cello
Gareth Flowers – trumpet
Christopher McIntyre, Jacob Garchik, Matt Plummer – trombone
Steven Gosling, Joseph Kubera, Christopher McDonald – piano
Cornelius Dufallo – violin
Marco Cappelli – guitar, electric guitar, mandolin
Jameson Swanagon – electric guitar
Ben Davis, Ken Filiano, Sean Conly – bass
Cory Pesaturo, Ted Reichman – accordion
Jim Pugliese, Kevin Norton – percussion
Eli Keszler – drums

References

New World Records albums
Anthony Coleman albums
2007 albums